Amelie Rybäck (or Amelie Rybeck), is a Swedish football defender who most recently played for Jitex BK in the Damallsvenskan. She previously played for Göteborg FC, Olympique Lyon in France's Division 1 and Stabæk Fotball in Norway's Toppserien.

References

External links
 

1982 births
Living people
Swedish women's footballers
Expatriate women's footballers in France
Expatriate women's footballers in Norway
BK Häcken FF players
Olympique Lyonnais Féminin players
Stabæk Fotball Kvinner players
Jitex BK players
Damallsvenskan players
Swedish expatriate women's footballers
Swedish expatriate sportspeople in Norway
Toppserien players
Division 1 Féminine players
Women's association football defenders